Portugal–Yugoslavia relations were historical foreign relations between Portugal and the former Yugoslavia (Kingdom of Yugoslavia 1918-1941 and Socialist Federal Republic of Yugoslavia 1945–1992). Portugal established diplomatic relations with the Kingdom of Serbia on 19 October 1917. with relations continuing with the successor Kingdom of Yugoslavia. The Portuguese recognized the government in exile of this state after the German occupation of 1941. The first Portuguese ambassador to Yugoslavia was Fernando Quartin de Oliveira Bastos who arrived in Belgrade in February 1941 with official residence in Bucharest. Relations with the Socialist Federal Republic of Yugoslavia, which took power in 1945 after World War II, were only established in 1974 after the Portuguese Carnation Revolution. This was because of Portuguese dictator António de Oliveira Salazar's strict anti-communism. Relations further soured during the Portuguese Colonial War as Yugoslavia provided military and other forms of aid to MPLA and other liberation movements fighting against Portugal. The first permanent Portuguese embassy was opened in Belgrade in July 1977 with Alvaro Manuel Soares Guerra as ambassador.

References

See also 
 Foreign relations of Portugal
 Foreign relations of Yugoslavia

Portugal
Yugoslavia
Croatia–Portugal relations
Portugal–Serbia relations